is a former Japanese football player and manager. He was currently manager of Vonds Ichihara until 31 January 2023.

Coaching career
Nuno was born in Chiba Prefecture on December 21, 1960. After attending Nippon Sport Science University in the late 70s and winning the All Japan University Championship, he opted to sign as a head coach at Funabashi Municipal High School, a role he maintained for almost 20 years. He decided to quit in order to be the next head coach of Japan U-17 national team, but the results didn't support him and he left after two years. He had another chance with Japan's squads, this time with Japan U-20 national team, but at the 2010 AFC U-19 Championship Japan were knocked out by South Korea in the quarter-finals, and he left the position in 2010.

He returned to coach with Fagiano Okayama in 2015, where he maintained a role as an assistant coach to Tetsu Nagasawa. After three years, he was hired as the manager of Thespakusatsu Gunma.

In 2022, Nuno announcement officially appointment manager of Vonds Ichihara for ahead of 2022 season.

Managerial statistics
Update; end of the 2022 season

References

External links

Profile at Thespakusatsu Gunma

1960 births
Living people
Nippon Sport Science University alumni
Association football people from Chiba Prefecture
Japanese footballers
Japanese football managers
J2 League managers
J3 League managers
Thespakusatsu Gunma managers
Matsumoto Yamaga FC managers
FC Imabari managers
Association football defenders